Vyatskoye (alternatively known as Viatsk or Viatskoe) is a small fishing village in Khabarovsky District, Khabarovsk Krai, Russia, located on the east side of the Amur River,  northeast of Khabarovsk. The 76th Radio Technical Brigade is stationed there.

History
The original inhabitants apparently were various Tungusic peoples.

Formerly part of Outer Manchuria, Vyatskoye along with Khabarovsk and Vladivostok was ceded to Imperial Russia by the Qing dynasty as part of the 1860 Convention of Peking.

During World War II near Vyatskoye was a camp for the Soviet 88th Brigade, which was made up of Korean and Chinese guerrillas. Kim Il-sung, future leader of North Korea, was stationed there as a Captain in the Soviet Red Army commanding a battalion, and according to some sources his family was there as well. According to those same sources his son Kim Jong-il was born there on February 16, 1941 (although the North Korean government claims Kim Jong-il was born on Paektu Mountain in Japanese Korea a year later, on February 16, 1942). Residents of the town claim that his brother Shura Kim (sometimes known as the first Kim Pyong-il) fell into a well and died, and was buried there; however other sources claim that Kim Jong-il's sibling drowned in a pool in Pyongyang in 1947.

Notes

  audio file
 

Rural localities in Khabarovsk Krai
Kim Jong-il